Suessenguthiella caespitosa is a species of plant in the Molluginaceae family. It is endemic to Namibia.  Its natural habitat is rocky areas.

References

Flora of Namibia
Molluginaceae
Least concern plants
Taxonomy articles created by Polbot